Brackenridge Park is a 343-acre public park in San Antonio, Texas, USA, on the city's Broadway Corridor just north of downtown San Antonio.

Brackenridge Park also refers to the district of the city where the park is located.

History

It was created in 1899 from land donated to the city by George Washington Brackenridge.

Recreation and features

Attractions within the park include the San Antonio Zoo, the Witte Museum, the Japanese Tea Gardens, the Sunken Garden Theater, the Tuesday Musical Club, First Tee of San Antonio and the  narrow gauge San Antonio Zoo Eagle train ride, which first opened in 1956.  Other nearby attractions include the DoSeum and the San Antonio Botanical Garden.

Inside the park, there are multiple baseball fields, playgrounds, pavilions, and walking trails.

See also
 Acequia Madre de Valero (San Antonio)
Dionicio Rodriguez
San Antonio Japanese Tea Garden
Fountain at Alamo Cement Company
Fence at Alamo Cement Company
Brackenridge Park Golf Course
Brackenridge Park Bridge

References

External links

Brackenridge Park History
Wild Texas Parks: Brackenridge Park

Parks in Texas
Tourist attractions in San Antonio
Parks in San Antonio
Protected areas of Bexar County, Texas
National Register of Historic Places in San Antonio
Parks on the National Register of Historic Places in Texas
National Park Service rustic in Texas